Phenylmercuric acetate is an organomercury compound used as a preservative, disinfectant, and antitranspirant.

Properties 
Phenylmercuric acetate forms colorless, lustrous crystals, and is soluble in ethanol, benzene, acetic acid, and sparingly in water.

Applications
Phenylmercuric acetate has been used as a preservative in eyedrops and paint, disinfectant, former fungicide in agriculture, and a potential fungicide in leather processing. It kills crabgrass, the seedlings of which are especially vulnerable, but leaves most lawn grasses intact. It exhibits anti-fungal activity against a broad range of ocular pathogenic fungi, with the greatest activity against Fusarium spp, and has been investigated as a potential treatment for keratomycosis.

Phenylmercuric acetate was used for disinfecting mucous membranes, but due to toxicological and ecotoxicological reasons, is no longer used. In the 1950s, phenylmercuric acetate was used as a catalyst in 3M Tartan brand polyurethane flexible floors, a common flooring used public buildings, especially in school gymnasiums, but due to concerns about mercury vapors, is not used.

Hazards
Contact with phenylmercuric acetate can cause allergic reactions., such as erythema and contact urticaria syndrome. IgE plays a crucial role in contact urticaria syndrome pathogenesis.

A rare side effect of phenylmercuric acetate in eye drops is mercurialentis, the buildup of pigment on the anterior capsule of the lens. This has been estimated to affect 18 of 500 patients who have used eye drops containing phenylmercuric acetate two to four times a day for more than six years. The pigmentation is not associated with visual impairment nor any ocular abnormalities.

See also
 Phenylmercuric borate
 Phenylmercuric nitrate

References

Organomercury compounds
Phenyl compounds